Mikhail Solovyov may refer to:

 Mikhail Solovyov (footballer, born 1968), Russian football player and coach
 Mikhail Solovyov (footballer, born 1997), Russian football player
 Mikhail Solovyov (lieutenant) (1917–1943), Red Army lieutenant